The RGS Mirage GT1 is a grand tourer-style race car, designed, developed and built by RGS Motorsport, built to the FIA's GT1 regulations, in 1997. It was based on the Lamborghini Countach, but was powered by a Chevrolet LS1 small-block OHV V8 engine. Between 2000 and 2003, it also notably competed in the GT500 and GT3000 classes of the All-Japan JGTC Championship.

References

Grand tourer racing cars